The name Bining was used for nine tropical cyclones by the Philippine Atmospheric, Geophysical and Astronomical Services Administration (PAGASA) in the Western Pacific Ocean.

 Typhoon Patsy (1965) (T6501, 01W, Bining) – an early-season typhoon that impacted the Philippines
 Tropical Depression Bining (1969) – short-lived early season disturbance that was only monitored by PAGASA.
 Typhoon Billie (1973) (T7303, 04W, Bining) – strong typhoon which brushed the Philippine and Taiwanese coasts before striking northeast China.
 Tropical Depression 02W (1977) – another weak tropical depression that remained short-lived.
 Severe Tropical Storm Ike (1981) (T8104, 04W, Bining) – strong tropical storm which affected Hong Kong, the Philippines and Taiwan, producing moderate damage.
 Typhoon Gay (1985) (T8503, 03W, Bining) – another powerful early-season typhoon that did not impact land.
 Typhoon Brenda (1989) (T8903, 03W, Bining) – a typhoon which crossed the Philippines and China, killing at least 104 people.
 Tropical Depression 03W (1993) – weak system that made landfall in Mindanao, causing minimal damage.
 Tropical Storm Levi (1997) (T9704, 05W, Bining) – a tropical storm which impacted the Philippines, claiming 53 lives and inflicting significant damage.

Pacific typhoon set index articles